Hatfield Hall was a private school for girls in Cobourg, Ontario, Canada. It opened in 1927 and closed in 1952. 

The school located at 202 Green Street, south of King Street, and associated with nearby St. Peter's Anglican Church. The church's rector, Dr. Temple Boyle, also served as school president.

Canadian poet Elizabeth Smart attended the school.

After the school closed in 1952 the buildings continued to be used. From 1957 until 1972, the main school building was used by the local radio station CHUC-FM. The rooms in the building are currently rented as apartments.

Private schools in Ontario
Cobourg
Buildings and structures in Northumberland County, Ontario